Seoul National University Hospital (서울대학교병원) is one of the oldest and biggest hospitals in South Korea. It is a general and teaching hospital of Seoul National University's College of Medicine. Its headquarters are in Yongon-dong, Jongno-gu in Seoul (서울특별시 종로구 연건동). 
Seoul National University Hospital consists of four branches:

Except SNUH Healthcare System Gangnam Center, all branches have an emergency department (ED).

SNUH is owned and operated by SNUH Special Corporation, independent from Seoul National University. The South Korean government's Ministry of Education and Human Resources partly supervises management of the hospital.

History 
Seoul National University Hospital was started as Naebu Hospital (내부병원) and changed into Gwangjewon (광제원) in 1900 and Daehan Hospital (대한의원) in 1907. In 1910, when Imperial Japan colonized Korea, its name changed to Viceroyalty Hospital of Chosun (조선총독부의원). During the colonization period, the institution was under the direct supervision of the Japanese viceroyalty. Koreans had a rather scarce number of opportunities to learn medicine at that time.

In 1924, the viceroyalty moved the site of the hospital to the current location of SNUH. When Imperial Japan surrendered to the United States in 1945, Korea was liberated from Japanese rule. After liberation, the government of the Republic of Korea installed Seoul National University's School of Medicine on the site of the Viceroyalty Hospital. Until 1978, SNUH was a state-owned hospital. However, the government handed off the hospital's ownership by forming SNUH P.C., an independent professional corporation.

See also 
List of hospitals in South Korea
Seoul National University Hospital Massacre

References

Hospital
Teaching hospitals in South Korea
Hospitals established in 1885
Jongno District
Hospitals in Seoul